The siege of Utica was a siege during the Second Punic War between the Roman Republic and Carthage in 204 BC. Roman general Scipio Africanus besieged Utica, intending to use it as a supply base for his campaign against Carthage in North Africa. He launched repeated and coordinated army-navy assaults on the city, all of which failed. The arrival of a large Carthaginian and Numidian relief army under Carthaginian general Hasdrubal Gisco and Numidian king Syphax in late autumn forced Scipio to break off the siege after 40 days and retreat to the coast.

Prelude
After a three-day journey from Sicily, Scipio's army of 35,000 men landed near Cape Farina, sixteen miles northeast of the city of Utica, causing panic in the Carthaginian civilians in the countryside, who quickly fled into towns. Carthage had available 14,200 inexperienced men, comprising 13,000 infantry and 1,200 cavalry, situated 25 miles inland under General Hasdrubal Gisco. The Carthaginian senate immediately issued an order for a general mobilization and called for aid from Syphax. Hasdrubal recruited more cavalry and acquired 4,000 horses from the Numidians. Scipio moved inland, capturing a ridgeline and unloading men, horses, and supplies onto a beachhead, set up guards and outposts and sent cavalry forces to reconnoiter, burn, and pillage Carthaginian farms and property. A 1,000-strong Carthaginian cavalry squadron under the aristocrat Hanno, sent to observe and harass Scipio, was defeated by the Roman cavalry and Hanno was killed. The Roman army then captured a nearby town. The rich Carthaginian farmlands were thoroughly looted by the Romans and 8,000 people, Carthaginian civilians and slaves alike, were kidnapped and sent to Sicily as hostages, along with considerable booty.

Siege
Scipio moved to Utica and set up his forces on a line of hills one mile from it. The Roman fleet attempted to blockade Utica's port. Scpio's intention was to capture the ancient Phoenician port city and make it a supply base for his further operations. Scipio had siege engines and artillery with him, received further artillery as reinforcements from Sicily and had craftsmen build more artillery in an arsenal. The direct assault on the walls was repulsed even though it was supported by siege engines and the Roman fleet, so that the Romans had to undertake a regular siege of the city. The emergence of two large armies of the enemy effectively ended the siege after forty days. These were the forces of Hasdrubal Gisgo and his son-in-law Syphax, who apparently did not hesitate anymore. Their numerical superiority (according to the tradition passed by ancient authors such as Polybius and Livy, the army of Hasdrubal amounted to more than 30,000 and that of Syphax was twice as many, but these numbers are considered as exaggerated by modern researchers) forced Scipio to retreat to a promontory not far from Utica, which was later called Castra Cornelia. He fortified the narrow neck of land and set his winter quarters, relying on supplies of corn and clothing that were being sent to him from Sicily, Sardinia, and Iberia. Hasdrubal and Syphax built their separate camps some distance from Castra Cornelia.

References

Citations

Bibliography
 Scullard, H. H., Scipio Africanus: Soldier and Politician, New York, Cornell University Press, 1970, Standard Book Number 8014-0549-1

Utica
Utica (204 BC)
204 BC
Utica (204 BC)
Utica 204
Battles involving Numidia